The Kansas Department of Agriculture is a department of the government of Kansas under the Governor of Kansas. It is responsible for providing services and expertise that promote and protect Kansas' food supply and natural resources while stimulating economic growth. The head of the Department is the Secretary of Agriculture, who is appointed by the Governor, with the approval of the Kansas Senate.

The current Secretary of Agriculture is Mike Beam, who was appointed by Governor Laura Kelly in 2019. Former Secretaries of Agriculture have included Jackie McClaskey, Sam Brownback, Foster Dwight Coburn, Alfred Gray, Adrian Polansky, and Joshua Svaty.

History 
Initially, the Kansas State Agricultural Society began organization is 1855 and held the first public meeting in 1857, while Kansas was a territory. The Kansas Legislature officially adopted the Kansas State Agricultural Society as a state entity in 1862. The Kansas Board of Agriculture was created in 1872, building upon the work of the Kansas State Agricultural Society, which had served as a model for departments of agriculture nationwide.  The agency became the Kansas Department of Agriculture in 1995.

The Department traces its history back to the 1850s when a group of farmers in Kansas Territory created agriculture "societies." Records of the earliest society, established in 1857, are sparse because they were burned when a confederate named William Quantrill raided and burned Lawrence, Kansas.

On March 5, 1862, the Kansas Legislature created the Kansas State Agricultural Society, with Floyd Perry Baker temporarily presiding, by statute to organize agricultural work statewide.  In 1872, the Kansas Legislature created the State Board of Agriculture from the structure of the Agriculture Society. It became the grandfather of agricultural departments in all fifty states.

The board's early years were spent organizing a state fair and acting as an immigration agency to attract needed settlers to homestead in Kansas. Gradually, the state lost its image as a part of the "Great American Desert". Farms and towns sprang up on the fertile plains of the future wheat state. The Board of Agriculture through an annual report and various publications about Kansas served as a source of information and new techniques in farming.

Through the grasshopper invasion, droughts, blizzards, and through the invention of barbed wire, the development of combines and advances undreamed in 1872, the Kansas Board of Agriculture has served the producers and consumers of Kansas agricultural products. In 1994, the Board was renamed the Kansas Department of Agriculture.

Today, the Kansas Department of Agriculture has many divisions and programs including the Agricultural Laboratory, Agricultural Marketing, Advocacy, and Outreach Team, Dairy and Feed Safety, Division of Animal Health, Division of Conservation, Division of Water Resources, Emergency Management, Food Safety and Lodging, Grain Warehouse, Meat and Poultry Inspection, Pesticide and Fertilizer, Plant Protection and Weed Control, and Weights and Measures. The Department also provides a large variety of services including licensing guides, grants and cost-share programs, Kansas commodity commissions, export inspections (foreign or domestic), soil fumigation notifications, weed free forage inspections, export certificate applications, live plant inspection applications, and much more.

On June 16, 2014, the majority of the department's employees were moved from Topeka to offices in Manhattan, Kansas.

Leadership
The Department is administered by the Secretary of Agriculture. Under Governor Laura Kelly, Mike Beam was appointed as Secretary in January 2019.

State Board of Agriculture
The Kansas State Board of Agriculture serves as an advisory board to the Governor of Kansas and the Secretary of Agriculture. The Board is composed of nine members, appointed by the Governor to serve four year terms. One member is appointed from each of Kansas' four congressional districts, with the remaining five being appointed at-large. No two members can reside in the same county and no more than five members may be from the same political party. The Board is responsible for electing its own Chair and Vice Chair.

The Board assists the Governor and Secretary in the development of legislative priorities and Departmental rules and regulations, except those which relate solely to personnel matters of the Department. The Board, however, has no powers, duties or functions concerning the day-to-day operations of the Department.

The Board includes the following: Tracy Brunner (District 1), Larry Powell (District 1), Jerry C. McReynolds (District 1), William Pracht (District 2), Thad G. Geiger (District 2), Ann M. Peuser (District 2), Scott Strickland (District 3), Dan Heinz (District 3), and Michael L. Springer (District 4).

Divisions
Secretary of Agriculture
Administrative Services - responsible for coordinating the management functions of the Department
Office of the Secretary
Fiscal Section
Agriculture Statistics
Human Resources
Information Technology
Legal Section
Emergency Management
Information Technology Section
Agricultural Business Services
Agricultural Laboratory
Grain Warehouse
Weights & Measures
Dairy and Feed Safety 
Food Safety and Lodging
Meat and Poultry Inspection
Plant Protection and Weed Control
Pesticide and Fertilizer
Agricultural Marketing, Advocacy and Outreach Team
Division of Animal Health
Division of Conservation
Division of Water Resources - governs how the state's water resources are allocated and used and regulates through statute the construction of dams, levees and other changes to streams.
Appropriations
Management Services
Structures

References

External links
 
 Kansas Dept. of Agriculture publications at State Library of Kansas' KGI Online Library

Agriculture, Department of
State departments of agriculture of the United States
1872 establishments in Kansas
Government agencies established in 1872